The Clune Building (also known as the Stadnik Building) is a historic site in Miami Springs, Florida. It is located at 45 Curtiss Parkway. On November 1, 1985, it was added to the U.S. National Register of Historic Places.  It was a work of Curtiss & Bright.

The Miami Springs Historical Museum was formerly located in the building, above Stadnik's Miami Springs Pharmacy, but moved to another location in 2006.

References

External links

 Dade County listings at National Register of Historic Places
 Florida's Office of Cultural and Historical Programs
 Dade County listings

Buildings and structures in Miami-Dade County, Florida
National Register of Historic Places in Miami-Dade County, Florida
Pueblo Revival architecture in Miami Springs, Florida